Conscious Consumer is the second and final studio album by English punk rock band X-Ray Spex, the first new material recorded by the band in seventeen years. It was recorded in 1995 and released in September of that year by record label Receiver. The album saw the return of saxophonist Lora Logic, sacked from the original incarnation of the band but reconciled with singer Poly Styrene during the 80s, as well as original bassist Paul Dean.

Reception 

The A.V. Club wrote that the album "revived the group's original anti-consumerist stance, but tempered it with Styrene's newfound serenity on songs like 'Prayer for Peace'", while Richie Unterberger of AllMusic echoed similar sentiments.

Track listing

Personnel 
X-Ray Spex
 Poly Styrene – vocals
 Red Spectre – guitar, "guitar arrangements"
 Lora Logic – saxophone, "saxophone melodies" 
 Paul Dean – bass, "bass lines"
 Pauli OhAirt – drums, "drum energy"
with:
 Peter-Paul Hartnett – Japanese backing vocals and dog howl, photography
Andrew Scarth, Gareth Jones, James Thompson, John Mallison, Simon Burwell, Tony Harris - "engineering and sonic architecture"

References

External links 

 

1995 albums
X-Ray Spex albums